The 2008–09 A Group was the 85th season of the Bulgarian national top football division, and the 61st of A Group as the top tier football league in the country. It began on 9 August 2008 and ended on 13 June 2009. CSKA Sofia were the defending champions, but they were unable to retain it and Levski Sofia won the title, which was their 26th overall.

Promotion and relegation

Three teams were promoted from the 2007–08 B Group. These include the champions of the East and West B Groups, as well as the promotion playoff winner, decided through a one match between the runners-up of the two B Groups. The promoted teams were Lokomotiv Mezdra, Sliven, and Minyor Pernik. Lokomotiv Mezdra made their debut in the top tier of Bulgarian football, Sliven return after a fifteen-year absence, while Minyor Pernik return to the top tier after a seven-year absence.  

Teams promoted from B PFG after the 2007–08 season
 West group champions: Lokomotiv Mezdra
 East group champions: OFC Sliven
 Play-offs: Minyor Pernik

Teams relegated to B PFG after the 2007–08 season
 Vidima-Rakovski Sevlievo
 Marek Dupnitsa
 Beroe Stara Zagora

Team overview

League table

Results

Champions
Levski Sofia

Iliev and Jean Carlos left the club during a season.

Top scorers

1. Saidhodzha scored 7 goals for Botev Plovdiv and 7 for CSKA Sofia (he was transferred during the winter break)
2. Fernández scored 4 goals for Cherno More Varna and 5 for Chernomorets Burgas (he was transferred during the winter break)

Annual awards

Team of the season
The team have been voted by selected media representatives (Note: First team members are denoted in bold).

See also
 2008–09 B Group

References

External links
2008–09 Statistics of A Group at a-pfg.com

First Professional Football League (Bulgaria) seasons
1
Bul